Troncal may refer to:

El Troncal Airport, airport located in Arauquita, Columbia
La Troncal Canton, a canton in Ecuador
La Troncal, seat of La Troncal Canton in the Cañar Province, Ecuador
Troncal de la Sierra, official name of Ecuador Highway 35 (E-35), a primary highway in Ecuador. colloquially known as "La Panamericana"